En Vivo, Vol. 2 (Eng.: Live, Volume 2) is the second live album released by Marco Antonio Solís from El Teatro de Bellas Artes Puerto Rico on October 8, 2001.

Track listing

All songs written and composed by Marco Antonio Solís

Personnel 

Victor Aguilar – percussion
Fabiola Antunez – coros
Fidel Arreygue – Bass
Gustavo Borner – engineer, mastering
Emilio García – drums
Carlos Francisco Hernandez – engineer
Salo Loyo – piano
Rodolfo Luviano – keyboards, musical direction
Charles Paakkari – engineer
Fabian Perez – acoustic guitar, electric guitar
Marco Antonio Solís – musical direction, realization
Emilsam Velazquez – engineer

References

External links
Marco Antonio Solís Official website
 En Vivo, Vol. 2 on social.zune.net

Spanish-language live albums
2001 live albums
Marco Antonio Solís live albums
Fonovisa Records live albums